Philibert Randriambololona (1 May 1927 – 17 April 2018) was a Catholic archbishop.

Randriambololona was born in Madagascar and was ordained to the priesthood in 1961 for the Society of Jesus. Randriambololona served as coadjutor bishop of the Diocese of Antsirabe, Madagascar, from 1988 to 1989 and then as bishop of the diocese from 1989 to 1992. He then served as the archbishop of the Roman Catholic Archdiocese of Fianarantsoa, Madagascar from 1992 to 2002.

See also
Catholic Church in Madagascar

Notes

1927 births
2018 deaths
20th-century Roman Catholic archbishops in Madagascar
Malagasy Jesuits
Jesuit archbishops
21st-century Roman Catholic archbishops in Madagascar
Malagasy Roman Catholic archbishops
Malagasy Roman Catholic bishops
Roman Catholic bishops of Antsirabé